The Journal of Neuropathology & Experimental Neurology is a monthly peer-reviewed medical journal covering neuropathology and experimental neuroscience. It is published by Oxford University Press and the editor-in-chief is Raymond A. Sobel (Stanford University School of Medicine). It was established in 1942 and is the official journal of the American Association of Neuropathologists.

Abstracting and indexing 
The journal is abstracted and indexed in the Science Citation Index, Current Contents/Life Sciences, BIOSIS Previews, and Index Medicus/MEDLINE/PubMed. According to the Journal Citation Reports, the journal has a 2014 impact factor of 3.797.

Past editors-in-chief 
 1942–1949: George B. Hassin
 1950–1952: 
 1953–1960: Armando Ferraro
 1962–1983: Arthur Weil

References

External links 
 

Neurology journals
Lippincott Williams & Wilkins academic journals
Publications established in 1942
English-language journals
Monthly journals